Sultan Ahmed (Bengali: সুলতান আহমেদ) (6 June 1953 – 4 September 2017) was an Indian politician and the Union Minister of State for Tourism in the Manmohan Singh government. He was elected to the 15th Lok Sabha from Uluberia (Lok Sabha constituency) on a Trinamool Congress ticket. He had previously been a 2-time Congress MLA for Entally (in 1987–91 and once again in 1996–2001).

Sultan Ahmed joined the Chatra Parishad (student wing of INC) while studying at Maulana Azad College in 1969 and the Youth Congress in 1973. He was District Secretary of Youth Congress from 1978 to 1980. Sultan Ahmed also was one of the founding-members of Trinamool Congress in 1998. He had been secretary of Mohammedan Sporting Club Kolkata, and later President. Ahmed also served as president of Calcutta Muslim Orphanage and got many reforms in the body. He was also president of Muslim Institute and a member of All India Muslim Personal Law Board. He was renowned for his work in various other Minority Organisations in Kolkata.
He was General Secretary of Muslim Institute in 1984 and President in 2017. Ahmed was also Vice Chairman of All India Hajj Committee from 2015 until the time of his death.  He served as a chairman of West Bengal Minority Development and Finance Corporation.

Sultan Ahmed died on Monday, 4 September 2017 at the age of 64 of cardiac arrest. He had gone into cardiac arrest at his home at about 11:15 to 11:30 am. He was rushed to a Belle Vue Clinic in Kolkata where doctors declared him dead on arrival.  
He had two sons, Dr.Taha Ahmed who is currently working in Apollo Gleneagles and is married to Zeba Khan Ahmed who is a lecturer by profession and is the sister of Mohsin Khan (actor) and other son is Sharique Ahmed who is unmarried, Sharique is the Finance Secretary of Mohammedan Sporting Club, India.

References

|-

External links

1953 births
2017 deaths
Tourism ministers of India
India MPs 2009–2014
India MPs 2014–2019
Trinamool Congress politicians from West Bengal
Maulana Azad College alumni
University of Calcutta alumni
Lok Sabha members from West Bengal
West Bengal MLAs 1987–1991
West Bengal MLAs 1996–2001
People from Howrah district
Indian National Congress politicians from West Bengal